KKTS (1580 AM) is a radio station licensed to Evansville, Wyoming, United States, and serving the Casper, Wyoming area.  The station airs a Hot AC format, and is locally owned and operated by Douglas Broadcasting, Inc. HitRadio KKTS also broadcasts on KKTS-FM 99.3 FM in Douglas, Wyoming.

KKTS-AM's license was granted on October 2, 2012. Its original call sign was KLNQ.

References

External links
KKTS's website

KTS
Hot adult contemporary radio stations in the United States
Radio stations established in 2012